Episcopal may refer to:

Of or relating to a bishop, an overseer in the Christian church
Episcopate, the see of a bishop – a diocese
Episcopal Church (disambiguation), any church with "Episcopal" in its name
 Episcopal Church (United States), an affiliate of Anglicanism based in the United States
Episcopal conference, an official assembly of bishops in a territory of the Roman Catholic Church
Episcopal polity, the church united under the oversight of bishops
Episcopal see, the official seat of a bishop, often applied to the area over which he exercises authority
Historical episcopate, dioceses established according to apostolic succession

See also 
 Episcopal High School (disambiguation)
 Pontifical (disambiguation)